The following lists events that happened during 1947 in the Grand Duchy of Luxembourg.

Incumbents

Events

January – March
 20 January – Pierre Krier dies, precipitating a crisis in the National Union Government.
 12 February – The National Union Government tenders its resignation.
 1 March – A centre-right government is formed between the Christian Social People's Party and the Democratic Group under incumbent Prime Minister Pierre Dupong.

April – June
 16 April – The Organisation for Economic Co-operation and Development is founded, with Luxembourg as one of the sixteen founding members.
 16 April – The government commits itself to seeking 11.1bn francs in war reparations.
 28 April – Eugène Rodenbourg is appointed to the Council of State, replacing Jacques Delahaye and Robert Als.
 16 June – A law is passed granting Société Nationale des Chemins de Fer Luxembourgeois management of the national railway network for 99 years.

July – September

October – December
 20 October – A law is passed conferring family welfare benefits on all employees.

Births
 31 August – Guy Rewenig, writer
 19 September Roger Gilson, cyclist
 20 December – Georges Schroeder, member of the Council of State

Deaths
 4 March – Pierre Krier, politician
 13 June – Frantz Funck-Brentano, historian
 22 August – Aline de Saint-Hubert, philanthropist

Footnotes

References